Springfield, Australia, may refer to the following places:

Springfield, New South Wales (Central Coast), a suburb of Central Coast
Springfield, New South Wales (Snowy Monaro Regional Council), a locality in the Snowy Monaro region
Springfield, Queensland, a planned city near Ipswich
Springfield, South Australia, a suburb of Adelaide
Springfield, Victoria (Shire of Buloke), a locality in the Shire of Buloke
Springfield, Victoria (Macedon Ranges), a locality in the Shire of Macedon Ranges
 West Moonah, Tasmania was known as Springfield from 1917 until the 1960s

See also
 Springfield (disambiguation)